The IIFA Award for Star Debut of the Year – Male is given by the International Indian Film Academy as part of its annual award ceremony to recognise a male actor who has delivered an outstanding performance in his debut film. Originally known as the "IIFA Award for Fresh Face of the Year (Male)", it was officially given its new title in 2006. During its inaugural year in 2001, four separate actors were presented with an award.

Winners

2000s
 2001Abhishek Bachchan – Refugee as Refugee (tied with) Hrithik Roshan – Kaho Naa... Pyaar Hai as Rohit/Raj Chopra,  Rahul Dev – Champion as Naseer Ahmed and Uday Chopra – Mohabbatein as Vikram Kapoor/Oberoi
 2002Arjun Rampal – Pyaar Ishq Aur Mohabbat as Gaurav Saxena
 2003John Abraham – Jism as Kabir Lal
 2004Shahid Kapoor – Ishq Vishk as Rajiv Mathur
 2005Not awarded 
 2006Shiney Ahuja – Hazaaron Khwaishein Aisi as Vikram Malhotra
 2007Upen Patel – 36 China Town as Rocky
 2008Ranbir Kapoor – Saawariya as Ranbir Raj
 2009Farhan Akhtar – Rock On!! as Aditya Shroff

2010s
 2010Jackky Bhagnani – Kal Kissne Dekha as Nihaal Singh (tied with) Omi Vaidya – 3 Idiots as Chatur Ramalingam (Silencer)
 2011Ranveer Singh – Band Baaja Baaraat as Bittoo Sharma
 2012Vidyut Jamwal – Force as Vishnu
 2013Ayushmann Khurrana – Vicky Donor as Vicky Arora
 2014Dhanush – Raanjhanaa as Kundan Shankar
 2015Tiger Shroff – Heropanti as Bablu
 2016Vicky Kaushal – Masaan as Deepak Chaudhary
 2017Diljit Dosanjh – Udta Punjab as Sartaaj Singh
 2018Not awarded 
 2019Ishaan Khatter – Dhadak as Madhukar "Madhu" Bhagla

2020s
 2020Abhimanyu Dassani – Mard Ko Dard Nahi Hota as Suryaanshu "Surya" Sampat
 2022Ahan Shetty – Tadap as Ishaan

See also
International Indian Film Academy Awards
IIFA Award for Star Debut of the Year – Female

References

International Indian Film Academy Awards
Film awards for male debut actors